The Ven. and The Hon Berkeley Lionel Scudamore Stanhope MA was Archdeacon of Hereford from 1887 to 1910.

Born at Gaydon in 1824,  he was the third son of Sir Edwyn Francis Scudamore-Stanhope, 2nd Baronet, and was educated at Balliol College, Oxford. A Fellow of All Souls College, Oxford, he was Vicar of Bosbury from  1856 to 1866 and Rector  of Byford from  1866 to 1908.

Scudamore-Stanhope died on 21 March 1919.

Notes

1824 births
Alumni of Balliol College, Oxford
Fellows of All Souls College, Oxford
Archdeacons of Hereford
1919 deaths